Alvin "Shine" Robinson (December 22, 1937 – January 25, 1989), sometimes credited as Al Robinson, was an American rhythm and blues singer, guitarist, and songwriter, based in New Orleans.  His recording of "Something You Got" reached the Billboard Hot 100 in 1964.

Biography
He was born in New Orleans, and by the late 1950s was established as a session musician in the city.  In 1961, he recorded for Imperial Records in New Orleans, with "I'm Leaving You Today" betraying his influence by Ray Charles. His management was soon taken over by singer Joe Jones, who had had a hit with "You Talk Too Much" and who won Robinson a recording contract with Tiger Records, a new label set up in New York City by songwriters and record producers Jerry Leiber and Mike Stoller.  In 1964, he recorded a version of Chris Kenner's song "Something You Got".  The song, featuring Robinson's "fantastically bluesy growl", rose to no.52 on the Billboard pop chart.

He moved with Leiber and Stoller to their next label, Red Bird Records, and recorded "Down Home Girl", a song written by Leiber with Artie Butler, arranged by Joe Jones, and produced by Leiber and Stoller.  Although the record was critically acclaimed, and was regarded by Leiber and Stoller as the best record issued on the Red Bird label, it was not a commercial success, but was covered by the Rolling Stones on their 1965 album The Rolling Stones No. 2.  Robinson's later recordings for Red Bird and its subsidiary Blue Cat label, including a reshaped version of "Let The Good Times Roll" arranged by Wardell Quezergue, also failed to reach the charts.

Robinson continued to record in his own name and as a session guitarist.  He moved to Los Angeles, and recorded "Let Me Down Easy", written by King Curtis, for Atco in 1967.  He also began playing with Dr. John, and appeared as a guitarist on the albums Babylon, Dr. John's Gumbo, and Hollywood Be Thy Name, as well as co-writing several album tracks with Dr. John.  As a solo performer, Robinson recorded for Harold Battiste's A.F.O. and Pulsar labels; one of his recordings for Pulsar, "Sho' Bout To Drive Me Wild", featured contributions from many New Orleans musicians including Battiste, Dr. John, Jessie Hill and King Floyd.  He was also credited on Carly Simon's album Playing Possum, and Ringo Starr's Goodnight Vienna.

Robinson later returned to New Orleans, where he died in 1989 at the age of 51.

Discography
1961
"Haul Off and Die Over You" - Charly CRB 1181 
"Baby Don't Blame Me" - Charly CRB 11811)
"I'm Leaving You Today" - Imperial 5727
"Pain In My Heart" - Imperial 5727
"Wake Up (And Face Reality)" - Imperial 5762 
"I Wanna Know" - Imperial 5762 
"Truly" - Charly CRB 1181 
"Oh Red" - Post 10001, Imperial 5824 
1962
"The Blues" - Post 10001, Imperial 5824 
"They Said It Couldn't Be Done" - Charly CRB 1181
"Lazy Mary" - Charly CRB 1181
"Dedicated To Domino" - Charly CRB 1181
"Little Eva" - unissued 
"The Same Old Lonesome Town" - unissued
"I Can't Open The Door To Your Heart" - unissued
"The Wise Old Weeping Willow Tree" - unissued
1964
"Something You Got" - Tiger 104, Blue Cat 104 
"Searching'" - Tiger 104, Blue Cat 104
"Fever" - Red Bird 010 
"Down Home Girl" - Red Bird 010
1965
"How Can I Get Over You" - Blue Cat 108 
"I'm Gonna Put Some Hurt On You" - Blue Cat 108
"Bottom Of My Soul" - Blue Cat 113 
"Let The Good Times Roll" - Blue Cat 113
1966
"Whatever You Had You Ain't Got It No More" - Joe Jones JJ1, Strike JH307 
"You Brought My Heart Right Down To My Knees" - Joe Jones JJ1, Strike JH307
1967
"She Knows What To Do For Me" - unissued 
"Ton Of Joy" - unissued
"Let Me Down Easy" - Atco 6581
"Baby Don't You Do It" - Atco 6581
"Get Out Of My Life Woman" - unissued
"Neki Hoki" - unissued
"If It Don't Work Out"  - unissued
1969
"Give Her Up" - Pulsar 2417 
"Soulful Woman" - Pulsar 2417
"Empty Talk" - Pulsar 2408
"Sho' Bout To Drive Me Wild" - Pulsar 2408
"Tuned In, Turned On" - Ace (UK) 450
"Better Be Cool" - Ace (UK) 462
"I'll Never Be Alone" - Ace (UK) 462
"We Got Love" - Ace (UK) 462

References

1937 births
1989 deaths
Rhythm and blues musicians from New Orleans
American rhythm and blues musicians
American soul musicians
Singers from Louisiana
20th-century African-American male singers
African-American songwriters
20th-century American musicians
Imperial Records artists